is a railway station in Aka, Fukuoka Prefecture, Japan. It is on the Tagawa Line, operated by the Heisei Chikuhō Railway. Trains arrive roughly every 30 minutes.

Platforms

External links

References

Railway stations in Fukuoka Prefecture
Railway stations in Japan opened in 1895
Heisei Chikuhō Railway Tagawa Line